Sun Shengnan and Zhang Shuai were the defending champions, but both chose not to participate.

Chan Hao-ching and Chan Yung-jan defeated Tetiana Luzhanska and Zheng Saisai in the final to win the title.

Seeds

Draw

Draw

References
 Main Draw

Beijing International Challenger - Doubles
2011 Women's Doubles